Elvis Morris Donkoh is the current member of parliament for the Abura-Asebu-Kwamankese constituency. He was elected on the ticket of the New Patriotic Party (NPP) and won with 22,245 votes to become the MP. He succeeded Anthony Christian Dadzie who had represented the constituency in the 4th Republic parliament on the ticket of the National Democratic Congress (NDC).

See also
List of Ghana Parliament constituencies

References 

Parliamentary constituencies in the Central Region (Ghana)